Ahmet Yesevi University (Ahmet Iasaýı ýnıversıteti) is a university in the city of Turkistan in Kazakhstan, named for the twelfth-century Sufi poet Khoja Akhmet Yassawi. Akhmet Yassawi International Kazakh-Turkish University (Akhmet Yassawi University) established in 1991 on the personal initiative of the Head of State N.A. Nazarbayev and based on the Intergovernmental Agreement between Kazakhstan and Turkey to train modern highly qualified specialists from young Turkic-speaking countries, the spiritual center of the Turkic world – Turkestan and is the first university that received the status of an international institution of higher education.

On October 31, 1992, the Governments of the Republic of Kazakhstan and the Republic of Turkey signed the Agreement on the reorganization of the university into Khoja Akhmet Yassawi International Kazakh-Turkish University.

The university’s multi-level education system includes: higher basic education (undergraduate), internship, magistracy, residency and doctoral studies. Admission to the university is carried out on state and Turkish educational grants and on a contractual basis.

The University is a member of the Caucasus University Association.

See also
 List of universities in Kazakhstan

 http://ayu.edu.kz/en/about/history

External links
Website 
 www.ayu.edu.kz

Educational institutions established in 1991
1991 establishments in Kazakhstan
Ahmet Yesevi University